Soukaina Sahib (born 1 April 1995) is a Moroccan taekwondo practitioner. She won the gold medal in the women's 46 kg event at the 2021 Islamic Solidarity Games held in Konya, Turkey. She represented Morocco at the 2019 African Games held in Rabat, Morocco and she won the gold medal in the women's 46 kg event.

At the 2018 African Taekwondo Championships held in Agadir, Morocco, she won the gold medal in the women's 46 kg event.

References

External links 
 

Living people
1995 births
Place of birth missing (living people)
Moroccan female taekwondo practitioners
African Taekwondo Championships medalists
African Games medalists in taekwondo
African Games gold medalists for Morocco
Competitors at the 2019 African Games
21st-century Moroccan women